Berkenthin is a municipality in the district of Lauenburg, in Schleswig-Holstein, Germany. It is situated on the Elbe-Lübeck Canal, approx. 10 km northwest of Ratzeburg, and 15 km south of Lübeck.

Berkenthin is the seat of the Amt ("collective municipality") Berkenthin.

References

Herzogtum Lauenburg